Manfred Kreuz (born 7 March 1936) is a retired German footballer, who played his entire career for Schalke 04. From 1956 until 1963, he completed 135 matches (42 goals) in the Oberliga West. Between 1963 and 1968, he was the captain of Schalke and made 83 appearances (17 goals) in the Bundesliga.

In 1958, he won the German championship.

He is an honorary captain of Schalke and member of the honorary presidium.

References

External links 
 

1936 births
Living people
German footballers
Association football midfielders
Association football forwards
Bundesliga players
FC Schalke 04 players
Sportspeople from Gelsenkirchen
Footballers from North Rhine-Westphalia